Morteza Heidari (born 17 June 1968 in Tehran) is an Iranian TV presenter. His surname is also spelled Heydari.

Career
By 2009 he was an interview moderator of political and news programs on IRIB's Channel 2. He hosted the 2013 Iranian presidential election's debates.

Published work
 Eslamloueyan, Karim and Morteza Heydari. (2002). "Effects of Implementing a Non-interest Banking System on Monetary Policy Controlability and Policy-Goals Links in Iran." Islamic Banking and Finance: New Perspectivies on Profit-Sharing and Risk, eds., Munawar Iqbal and David T. Llewellyn. Northampton, MA: Endward Elgard Publishing. pp. 140–159.

See also 
Islamic Republic of Iran Broadcasting (IRIB)

References

1968 births
Living people
People from Tehran
Iranian television presenters
Iranian radio and television presenters